Watson is a suburb of Canberra, Australia in the North Canberra district. Watson is named after the third Prime Minister of Australia, John Christian Watson. The suburb name was gazetted on 7 April 1960. Streets in Watson are named after Australian judges and other legal professionals.

Watson is bordered by the Federal Highway, Phillip Avenue and Antill Street.
Traffic loads on these roads has increased significantly with the continued development of Gungahlin and studies suggest some areas will exceed capacity before 2021.

Features
Located in Watson is a local shopping centre and several schools, television studios and motels. The former Watson High School now houses the Canberra Technology Park which includes the Academy of Interactive Entertainment (AIE) as a tenant. Rosary Catholic Primary School is located in Watson, as is the Signadou campus of the Australian Catholic University. There is also Majura Primary School (originally Watson Primary School) which is well known for its annual Spring Carnival.

One of Canberra's two former drive-in theatres, the Starlight Drive-in, was located on the Federal Highway in Watson. The site has now been redeveloped as a medium-density housing complex, although the drive-in's sign remains.

Also located in the suburb are Prime7 television studios, The Ted Noffs Foundation, the Academy of Interactive Entertainment, Canberra Carotel (motel and caravan park), Red Cedars motel, Hotel Ibis Budget, Canberra Potters Society, a C3 Church, YWAM (Youth with a Mission) and a BP service station. CTC-TV (now Southern Cross 10), was located in the suburb from 1974 until June 2020 when the Watson studios were demolished and the station relocated to Fyshwick.

Transport
Watson is serviced by ACTION bus routes R9 and 50. Antill Street is also serviced by route 53.

Geology

Calcareous shales from the Canberra Formation is overlain in places by Quaternary alluvium.
This rock includes the limestone of the original title of Canberra "Limestone Plains".

References

External links

 Canberra Technology Park
 AIE
 Majura Primary School
 Rosary Primary School
 Australian Catholic University
 Canberra Potters Society
 C3 Church, Watson

Suburbs of Canberra